Francesca Dallapè (born 24 June 1986 in Trento) is an Italian diver. With Tania Cagnotto, she won silver in the 3 m synchronized springboard at the 2016 Summer Olympics.

Career
Dallapè finished sixth with Noemi Batki in the synchronized 3 metre springboard event of the 2008 Olympic Games.

At the 2012 Summer Olympics, Dallapé competed in both the individual 3 metre springboard, finishing in 15th, and the synchronised 3 metre springboard, finishing in 4th place with Tania Cagnotto. At the 2016 Summer Olympics, won silver in synchronized 3 metre springboard with Cagnotto.

Olympic results

References

External links

 
 
 
 

1986 births
Living people
Italian female divers
Olympic divers of Italy
Olympic silver medalists for Italy
Olympic medalists in diving
Divers at the 2008 Summer Olympics
Divers at the 2012 Summer Olympics
Divers at the 2016 Summer Olympics
Medalists at the 2016 Summer Olympics
World Aquatics Championships medalists in diving
Divers of Gruppo Sportivo Esercito
Sportspeople from Trento